Nick de la Hoyde is an Australian singer, songwriter, and rapper from Sydney. He has released several singles and one EP.

Early life

Nick de la Hoyde was born and grew up in Sydney, Australia. At age 15, he moved to Barcelona to pursue a soccer career. He began creating music during this time before eventually moving back to Australia and switching over to music full-time.

Career

De la Hoyde released his first single, "The Longest Way," in 2014. His YouTube videos had attracted the attention of Chicago-based producer, Lemoyne Alexander, who produced the song. "The Longest Way" peaked at number 4 on the Mediabase Top 40 Pop Independent Artists chart. In June 2015, de la Hoyde released his first EP, Passion, which included the songs "The Longest Way," "Aces," and "By My Side."
 
He would go on to release a single, "Changing," in December 2015 followed by the release of "Never Gonna Beg For It" in April 2016. He would later release an EP of remixes of "Never Gonna Beg For It" that included producers, RIDDLER, Zuzu, SERAFIN, and Kids On Bridges. In September 2016, he released another single, "Thinking Bout You."
 
In 2017, he released the single "Love Takes Time" which was accompanied by a video directed by Bruno Kataoka. He closed out the year with the release of "Hold Me Close."

Discography

EPs

Singles

References

External links
Official website

Living people
Australian singer-songwriters
Musicians from Sydney
Australian male rappers
Year of birth missing (living people)
Rappers from Sydney